Bafodeya is a genus of plants in the family Chrysobalanaceae described in 1976.

There is only one known species, Bafodeya benna, native to tropical West Africa (Mali, Guinea, Sierra Leone).

The species is listed as vulnerable.

References

Chrysobalanaceae
Monotypic Malpighiales genera
Flora of West Tropical Africa
Vulnerable plants
Chrysobalanaceae genera
Taxonomy articles created by Polbot